NART TV (National Adighe Radio and Television) is a Circassian television channel broadcast from JORDAN. Established in 2007, the channel's programs cover topics related to Circassian history and culture around the world.

External links
NART TV website

Television channels and stations established in 2007